The Defence Technology Institute (Public Organization) (DTI) is a research and development agency operating as a public organization under the oversight of the Thai Ministry of Defence.

Background
The DTI was founded on the 1st of January 2009 as part of a programme to increase domestic arms manufacturing capabilities.

Research and development
The DTI produces the Black Widow Spider 8x8 armoured vehicle for the Thai army in collaboration with Ricardo.

In 2017 DTI signed a Memorandum of Understanding with Leonardo helicopters covering "technology transfer and the establishment of helicopter maintenance, repair & overhaul".

The DTI has been involved in experiments to reduce air pollution in Bangkok using water-spraying drones.

In 2018, DTI signed a Memorandum of Agreement (MOA) with UK defence company, Arturius International and its Thai representative, GCS Group Corporation Company. The collaboration aims to create a Counter Threat Centre of Excellence in Thailand.

Gp Capt Chamnan Kumsap, director for knowledge management and the publication department at the DTI told the Bangkok post in 2018 that, "We plan to draft the Defence Technology Agency bill because it will unlock our ability to conduct joint defence projects".

See also
 Agency for Defense Development - South Korea
 Defense Advanced Research Projects Agency - United States
 Defence Industry Agency - Turkey
 Defence Research and Development Organisation - India
 Military Institute of Armament Technology - Poland
 National Chung-Shan Institute of Science and Technology - Taiwan
 Rafael Advanced Defense Systems - Israel
 Swedish Defence Research Agency - Sweden

References

Public organizations of Thailand
Military of Thailand
Military research institutes